Aleksei Igorevich Ivaschenko (born 12 May 1958 in Moscow) and Georgy Leonardovich Vasilyev (born 22 June 1957 in Zaporizhia, Ukraine) are a Soviet/Russian bard duo, informally known as Ivasi (a pun on the "iwashi herring"). They have also written and staged the musical Nord-Ost.

Discography

 A. Ivaschenko, G. Vasilyev 'Alma-Mater' (1997)
 A. Ivaschenko, G. Vasilyev 'Balanda o Seledke' (1997)
 A. Ivaschenko, G. Vasilyev 'Berezhkariki' (1997)
 A. Ivaschenko, G. Vasilyev 'Dvornik Stepanov' (1997)
 A. Ivaschenko, G. Vasilyev 'Pripadki Molodosti (Posliednii)' (1997)
 A. Ivaschenko, G. Vasilyev 'Pripadki Molodosti (Predposlednii)' (1997)
 A. Ivaschenko, G. Vasilyev 'Pripadki Molodosti (Dvoinoi)' (1997)
 'Pesni Nashego Veka' (in a bard ensemble) (2000)
 'Nord-Ost: Selected Songs' (2002)
 A. Ivaschenko 'Dve kapli na stakan vody' (2004)
 A. Ivaschenko, G. Vasilyev. Anthology (2004)
 'The Complete Nord-Ost' (2005)
 'Nord-Ost: Collection' (2005)
 A. Ivaschenko 'Esli' (2006)

External links
Unofficial web-site 
Songs of Ivasi

Russian bards
Russian male composers
Soviet male composers
20th-century Russian male singers
20th-century Russian singers
21st-century Russian male singers
21st-century Russian singers